To Town with Terry was a 1950s radio programme, broadcast on the BBC Home Service and hosted by Terry-Thomas.

The first episodes of series was broadcast on 12 October 1948 and subsequently ran weekly for 24 episodes until 28 March 1949. Terry-Thomas was unhappy with the series, saying "I was never totally satisfied with [it] ... The perfectionist in me always made me aware of anything that was less than first class".

The programme consisted of a "mixture of sketches, solo routines, musical interludes and a range of popular and topical star guests",

Notes and references

Bibliography

BBC Home Service programmes